Parapsallus vitellinus is a species of plant bug belonging to the family Miridae, subfamily Phylinae, that can be found everywhere in Europe except for Albania, Andorra, Greece, Lithuania, Norway, all states of former Yugoslavia, and various European and African islands.

References

Insects described in 1847
Hemiptera of Europe
Miridae